Joseph Angel Soto (born March 22, 1987) is an American professional mixed martial artist who most recently competed in the bantamweight division of the Ultimate Fighting Championship (UFC). A professional competitor since 2006, Soto has also formerly competed for Bellator Fighting Championships, where he was the inaugural Bellator Featherweight World Champion and first ever winner of their Featherweight Tournament, and for Tachi Palace Fights where he is the former Tachi Palace Fights Bantamweight Champion.

Background
At the time Soto was born, the fourth son, his parents were struggling financially, with his father working as a garbage man and his mother as a house cleaner. Soto grew up in a very religious Pentecostal family, attending church with his family weekly. Soto went to Porterville High School in California where he was on the wrestling team and won a California state title. Soto got an athletic scholarship to Iowa Central Community College was a 2x NJCAA All-American. There Soto wrestled with Jon Jones and fellow Mexican American Cain Velasquez plus Colby Covington. Soto and Jones were also roommates during their freshmen and sophomore years.

Mixed martial arts
Soto began training mixed martial arts after meeting another fighter who agreed to train him in his garage. Soto began training and took his first fight at a Gladiator Challenge event. Soto won the fight midway in the first round via technical knockout. Soto compiled a 4–0 record before getting signed to Bellator Fighting Championships.

Bellator
Soto joined Bellator by entering their Season One Featherweight Tournament. Soto made his debut defeating Ben Greer at Bellator 1.

In Soto's semi-final fight, which took place May 8 at Bellator 6, he dominated Wilson Reis from the opening bell with impeccable takedown defense and superior striking. Despite being a Brazilian Jiu-Jitsu black belt and the only EliteXC Featherweight Champion, Reis could never get the fight to the ground.

Soto advanced to the Bellator Featherweight Finals and took on Yahir Reyes. Soto won the fight by submission in the second round and became the first Bellator Featherweight Champion. A few days before the championships, Soto cut his eyelid while wrestling during a warm-up and had to go to the hospital. Knowing stitches were not an option, he and his friends went to a beauty parlor to have the cut covered with make-up. While the doctor was inspecting Soto, his camp made sure to crack jokes and distract the specialist from noticing the cut over his eye.

At Bellator 19, Soto fought Diego Saraiva in a "Super Fight". Soto won the fight after cage side doctors said Saraiva was unable to continue because of a cut on his forehead.

Soto had his first title defense in the third season, taking on the winner of the Season Two Featherweight Tournament, Joe Warren. Following a dominant first round Soto was knocked unconscious by Warren at 0:33 of the second round. In the fight, Soto suffered a detached retina and was forced to stay away from fighting for nearly a year.

Bellator promoter, Bjorn Rebney, stated that Soto was eligible to drop down a weight class for Bellator's Season Five Bantamweight Tournament with a win at Tachi Palace Fights 10. Soto lost to Eddie Yagin by first-round submission, and was replaced in the tournament. After the loss to Yagin, Soto was released from his Bellator contract.

Tachi Palace Fights
In January 2012 Soto picked up a win over Chris David and was signed to fight for Tachi Palace Fights. Soto fought his first TPF fight on May 10, 2012, against former WEC fighter, Chad George. Soto won the fight via second-round submission.

Ultimate Fighting Championship
In August 2014 Soto signed a deal with the UFC.

Soto was expected to face Anthony Birchak on August 30, 2014, at UFC 177. However, the day of the weigh-ins, Renan Barão had to be admitted to the hospital as a result of his attempts to cut weight. Soto stepped up and faced champion T.J. Dillashaw in the main event. He lost the fight via knockout in the fifth round.

A rescheduled bout with Anthony Birchak took place on June 6, 2015, at UFC Fight Night 68. Soto lost the fight via knockout in the first round.

Soto faced Michinori Tanaka on January 2, 2016, at UFC 195, filling in for an injured Russell Doane. He lost the fight by split decision.

Soto next faced Chris Beal on June 18, 2016, at UFC Fight Night 89. He won the back and forth fight via submission in the third round.

Soto was tabbed as a short notice replacement to face Marco Beltrán in a catchweight bout on November 5, 2016, at The Ultimate Fighter Latin America 3 Finale. He won the fight via submission in the first round.

Soto faced Rani Yahya on March 11, 2017, at UFC Fight Night 106. He won the back-and-forth fight via unanimous decision.

Soto faced Brett Johns on December 1, 2017, at The Ultimate Fighter 26 Finale. He lost the fight via submission in round one.

Soto faced Iuri Alcântara on February 3, 2018, at UFC Fight Night 125. The bout with Alcântara marked the last fight of Soto's four-fight contract with UFC.  He lost the fight via TKO due to strikes in the first round.

On August 28, 2018, it was reported that Soto was released by UFC.

Brazilian Jiu Jitsu

On August 15, 2015, Soto competed in Eddie Bravo Invitational 4 (The Bantamweights).

Soto entered the competition as an underdog, and his first bout was against Eddie Fyvie. Soto won the bout via heel hook in the opening round.

Soto then progressed into the quarterfinals, where he faced 2 time EBI champion Geo Martinez. He won the bout via quickest escape time during overtime.

Soto then progressed into the semifinals, where he faced Joao Miyao (another world-class opponent). He won the bout via quickest escape time during overtime.

Soto then progressed to the finals, where he faced leg lock specialist and favourite of the competition Eddie Cummings. Soto defended many of Cummings' leg lock attempts for several minutes until finally succumbing to a heel hook.

Championships and accomplishments

Mixed martial arts
Tachi Palace Fights
TPF Bantamweight Championship (One time)
Bellator Fighting Championships
Bellator Featherweight World Championship (One time; first)
Bellator Season One Featherweight Tournament Winner

Amateur wrestling
National Junior College Athletic Association
NJCAA Junior Collegiate Championship Runner-up (2007)
NJCAA Junior Collegiate Championship 3rd Place (2006)
NJCAA All-American (2006, 2007)
National High School Coaches Association
NHSCA Senior All-American (2005)
California Interscholastic Federation
CIF High School State Championship (2005)
CIF All-State (2003, 2005)
CIF Central Section Championship (2005)

Grappling
Eddie Bravo Invitational
EBI 4 Finalist (2015)

Mixed martial arts record

|-
|Loss
|align=center|18–7
|Iuri Alcântara
|TKO (body kick and punches)
|UFC Fight Night: Machida vs. Anders 
|
|align=center|1
|align=center|1:06
|Belém, Brazil
|
|-
|Loss
|align=center|18–6
|Brett Johns
|Submission (calf slicer)
|The Ultimate Fighter: A New World Champion Finale 
|
|align=center|1
|align=center|0:30
|Las Vegas, Nevada, United States
|
|-
|-
|Win
|align=center|18–5
|Rani Yahya
|Decision (unanimous)
|UFC Fight Night: Belfort vs. Gastelum
|
|align=center|3
|align=center|5:00
|Fortaleza, Brazil
|
|-
|Win
|align=center|17–5 
|Marco Beltrán
|Submission (heel hook)
|The Ultimate Fighter Latin America 3 Finale: dos Anjos vs. Ferguson
|
|align=center|1
|align=center|1:37
|Mexico City, Mexico
|

|-
|Win 
|align=center|16–5
|Chris Beal
|Submission (rear-naked choke)
|UFC Fight Night: MacDonald vs. Thompson
|
|align=center|3
|align=center|3:39
|Ottawa, Ontario, Canada
|
|-
|Loss
|align=center|15–5
|Michinori Tanaka
|Decision (split)
|UFC 195 
|
|align=center|3
|align=center|5:00
|Las Vegas, Nevada, United States
|
|-
| Loss
|align=center| 15–4
|Anthony Birchak
| KO (punches)
| UFC Fight Night: Boetsch vs. Henderson
| 
|align=center| 1
|align=center| 1:37
|New Orleans, Louisiana, United States
|
|-
| Loss 
| align=center| 15–3
| T.J. Dillashaw 
| KO (head kick and punches)
| UFC 177
| 
| align=center| 5
| align=center| 2:20
| Sacramento, California, United States
| 
|-
| Win 
| align=center| 15–2  
| Terrion Ware
| Submission (north-south choke)
| Tachi Palace Fights 20
| 
| align=center| 3
| align=center| 2:48  
| Lemoore, California, United States
| 
|-
| Win
| align=center| 14–2
| Jeremiah Labiano
| TKO (doctor stoppage)
| Tachi Palace Fights 18
| 
| align=center| 3
| align=center| 4:16
| Lemoore, California, United States
| 
|-
| Win
| align=center| 13–2
| Cory Vom Baur
| Submission (guillotine choke)
| Tachi Palace Fights 17
| 
| align=center| 1
| align=center| 4:36
| Lemoore, California, United States
| 
|-
| Win
| align=center| 12–2
| Chad George
| Technical Submission (rear-naked choke)
| Tachi Palace Fights 13
| 
| align=center| 2
| align=center| 2:01
| Lemoore, California, United States
| 
|-
| Win
| align=center| 11–2
| Chris David
| Submission (rear-naked choke)
| TWC 13: Impact
| 
| align=center| 2
| align=center| 4:28
| Porterville, California, United States
| 
|-
| Win
| align=center| 10–2
| Romeo McCovey
| Decision (unanimous)
| NFF: Norcal Fight Fest
| 
| align=center| 3
| align=center| 5:00
| Blue Lake, California, United States
| 
|-
| Loss
| align=center| 9–2
| Eddie Yagin
| Submission (guillotine choke)
| TPF 10: Let The Chips Fall
| 
| align=center| 1
| align=center| 2:00
| Lemoore, California, United States
| 
|-
| Loss
| align=center| 9–1
| Joe Warren
| KO (knee and punches)
| Bellator 27
| 
| align=center| 2
| align=center| 0:33
| San Antonio, Texas, United States
| 
|-
| Win
| align=center| 9–0
| Diego Saraiva
| TKO (doctor stoppage)
| Bellator 19
| 
| align=center| 1
| align=center| 5:00
| Grand Prairie, Texas, United States
| 
|-
| Win
| align=center| 8–0
| Mike Christensen
| Submission (gogoplata)
| TPF 1: Tachi Palace Fights 1
| 
| align=center| 1
| align=center| 2:06
| Lemoore, California, United States
| 
|-
| Win
| align=center| 7–0
| Yahir Reyes
| Submission (rear-naked choke)
| Bellator 10
| 
| align=center| 2
| align=center| 4:11
| Ontario, California, United States
| 
|-
| Win
| align=center| 6–0
| Wilson Reis
| Decision (unanimous)
| Bellator 6
| 
| align=center| 3
| align=center| 5:00
| Robstown, Texas, United States
| 
|-
| Win
| align=center| 5–0
| Ben Greer
| TKO (punches)
| Bellator 1
| 
| align=center| 1
| align=center| 3:40
| Hollywood, Florida, United States
| 
|-
| Win
| align=center| 4–0
| Anthony Luna
| Submission (kimura)
| Gladiator Challenge 86: Day of the Dead
| 
| align=center| 1
| align=center| 0:33
| Miami, Florida, United States
| 
|-
| Win
| align=center| 3–0
| Brandon Jinnies
| TKO (punches)
| PFC 10: Explosive
| 
| align=center| 1
| align=center| 0:59
| Lemoore, California, United States
| 
|-
| Win
| align=center| 2–0
| Darren Crisp
| Submission (kneebar)
| PFC 9: The Return
| 
| align=center| 1
| align=center| 1:08
| Lemoore, California, United States
| 
|-
| Win
| align=center| 1–0
| Jared Williams
| TKO (punches)
| Gladiator Challenge 53: Hell Storm
| 
| align=center| 1
| align=center| 3:26
| Porterville, California, United States
|

See also
 List of current UFC fighters
 List of male mixed martial artists
 List of Bellator champions

References

External links
 

Bellator Profile

American male mixed martial artists
American mixed martial artists of Mexican descent
Featherweight mixed martial artists
Mixed martial artists utilizing collegiate wrestling
Mixed martial artists utilizing boxing
Mixed martial artists utilizing Brazilian jiu-jitsu
Bellator MMA champions
1987 births
Living people
Mixed martial artists from California
People from Porterville, California
People from Tulare County, California
Ultimate Fighting Championship male fighters
American male sport wrestlers
Amateur wrestlers
American practitioners of Brazilian jiu-jitsu
People awarded a black belt in Brazilian jiu-jitsu